Subhakankshalu   is a 1997 Indian Telugu-language comedy-drama film, produced by N. V. Prasad and S. Naga Ashok Kumar under the Sri Sai Deva Productions banner and directed by Bhimaneni Srinivasa Rao. It stars Jagapati Babu, Ravali, Raasi and music jointly composed by Koti & S. A. Rajkumar. The film is remake of the 1996 Tamil movie Poove Unakkaga.

Plot
The film begins in a village where fierce rivalry upholds between two Hindu & Christian families which reside neighborly. Seetaramaiah & Stephen are its paterfamiliases, the friction continues amides with their respective wives and sons Balaramaiah & Moses. Indeed, the two used to be very affectionate and spent a lovely time 25 years ago. In those days, Seetaramaiah's daughter Janaki and Stephen's younger one Robert fell in love. Being the elders obstruct them, they elope and wedlock, leaving feud to their families.

At present, a young guy Chandu son of Robert & Janaki arrives along with his bestie Gopi but the families expel him. Plus, no one shelters them considering the threat from Balaramaiah & Moses. Anyhow, Chandu & Gopi accommodate them at the residence of noisy and frightful singer Nadabrahmam by entrapping him. Now Chandu aims to reconcile with his family and gradually endears himself to them. Besides, his grandmothers fix two different alliances for him. To evade it, on a hint of Gopi he proclaims that he already married a Hindu-Christian like himself, Nirmala Mary. Just a figment of his imagination, Chandu is startled by the entrance of a beautiful girl as his wife Nirmala Mary. Therefrom, she makes his life forlorn and Chandu whacks to impart the truth but fails. Ultimately, Nirmala comes clean as a flabbergast, that she real and only progeny of Robert & Janaki who is Priyadarshini.

Currently, she confronts Chandu about reality and he moves rearward. Chandu & Gopi are orphans and unemployed youth who stay as tenants at a penthouse. In their vicinal, a ladies' hostel is located where Nandini daughter of Balaramaiah, is a resident. Once, the girls are under the practice of a music competition but unable to compose the tune. Chandu indirectly helps her, and they triumph. Subsequently, Chandu & Nandini become good friends and he starts adoring her. On the verge of expressing his love to Nandini, she introduces Robert son of Moses as his fiancé when Chandu falls apart. Next, Lawrence & Nandini approach Chandu for the blessing of their nuptial which they are doing without the elders' knowledge. Here Chandu hinders them by learning about Robert & Janaki and assures the two to perform their espousal. Hence, he goals to fuse the families for his beloved happiness.

Listening to it, Nirmala / Priyadarshini respects and volunteers Chandu as well as silently loves him. After a few comic scenes, they merge the oldies. In the interim, Balaramaiah & Moses discovers the love affair of their children when they flare up and mutually onslaughts. During that plight, Chandu bars them and he is battered. At that point, Lawerance & Nandini appear by contrariwise their religions. Further, Seetaramaiah & Stephen also assert their sons regarding the glory of religion which makes them reform. Forthwith, the two kinds together nobly conduct  marital of love birds. Soon after, Chandu's true identity turns up with the arrival of Robert & Janaki. Then, the families decide to own Chandu by coupling Nirmala / Priyadarshini with him and Nandini takes up the responsibility. However, Chandu rejects it, saying to her that he has already dear a girl who got married. Beyond affirms, it's impossible to forget her and he is going to live the rest of his life with those sweet memories. Finally, the movie ends with Chandu walking out and a statement telling his eminence one that making his lover's marriage with her lover.

Cast

 Jagapati Babu as Chandu
 Ravali as Nirmala Mary / Priyadarshani
 Raasi as Nandini
 Krishna in a special appearance
 Satyanarayana as Sitaramaiah
 Nagesh as Stephen
 Anandaraj as Moses
 Devan as Balaramaiah
 Brahmanandam as Writer Tukaram
 Sudhakar as Gopi
 AVS as Nadabrahmam
 Mallikarjuna Rao as Buchi
 Maharshi Raghava as Robert
 Rakesh as Lawerence
 Sowkar Janaki as Sitaramaiah's wife
 Sukumari as Rosy (Stephen's wife)
 Sudha as Gayatri
 Rajitha as Janaki
 Y. Vijaya  as Nadabrahmam's wife
 Alphonsa (special appearance)
 Ranjitha in a special appearance

Soundtrack

Music composed by Koti and S. A. Rajkumar. Music released on Shivani Audio Company. Three songs from the original Tamil film Poove Unakkaga were retained here as "Ananda Ananda", "O Pori Pani Puri" and "Panchavennela".

Reception 
A critic from Andhra Today stated that "The director richly deserves `Subhkankshalu' (congratulations) for giving a good treatment to a neat story. The conclusion is different (away from the run-of-the mill)".

References

External links
 

Telugu remakes of Tamil films
Indian romantic comedy films
1997 romantic comedy films
Films about families
Films scored by S. A. Rajkumar
Films about feuds
1990s Telugu-language films
Films scored by Koti
Films directed by Bhimaneni Srinivasa Rao
1997 films